Bellator 284: Gracie vs. Yamauchi was a mixed martial arts event produced by Bellator MMA that took place on August 12, 2022, at Sanford Pentagon in Sioux Falls, South Dakota, United States.

Background 
The main event will feature a battle of submission specialists, with Neiman Gracie taking on Goiti Yamauchi. In his last bout, Neiman fought a five-round war against Logan Storley, where he lost the close bout via split decision. Yamauchi has won back-to-back fights, winning his debut at welterweight against Levan Chokheli in his last bout.

A bantamweight bout between Josh Hill and Matheus Mattos was scheduled for this event. However, Mattos pulled out due to a knee injury requiring knee surgery and was replaced by Marcos Breno.

A featherweight bout between Ilias Bulaid and Weber Almeida was scheduled to this event. However in July, the bout was scrapped due to unknown reasons.

A bantamweight bout between Sarvadzhon Khamidov and Jared Scoggins was scheduled for this event. However, the bout was scrapped for unknown reasons

A middleweight bout between Austin Vanderford and Anthony Adams was scheduled for this event. However after Adams pulled out of the bout 2 weeks before the event, Aaron Jeffery stepped in on short notice.

At weigh ins, three fighters missed weight; Ilima-Lei Macfarlane, who was three pounds over the division non-title fight limit at 129 lbs, Justine Kish who came in at 128.4 lbs for their flyweight bout, and Nick Perez who came in at 157.4 lbs for his lightweight bout. Macfarlane and Kish were fined a percentage of their purses and the bouts continued at catchweights, while Perez's bout against Isaiah Hokit was scrapped.

Results

See also 

 2022 in Bellator MMA
 List of Bellator MMA events
 List of current Bellator fighters
 Bellator MMA Rankings

References 

Bellator MMA events
2022 in mixed martial arts
August 2022 sports events in the United States
2022 in sports in South Dakota
Mixed martial arts in South Dakota
Sports competitions in South Dakota
Sports in Sioux Falls, South Dakota